Vice Admiral James Crilly Wood  (born 29 August 1934) is a retired Canadian Forces officer who served as Commander Maritime Command from 29 July 1983 to 3 July 1987.

Career
Wood joined the Royal Canadian Navy in 1951. He became Commanding Officer of the submarine  in 1967, a staff officer in the Directorate of Equipment Requirements at the National Defence Headquarters in 1970 and Commander of the First Canadian Submarine Squadron in 1972. He went on to be Deputy Chief of Staff (Sea) in 1974, Commanding Officer of the supply ship  in 1976 and Deputy Chief of Staff Plans in 1977. After that he became Senior Maritime Liaison Officer to The Netherlands in 1979, Director General Maritime Doctrine and Operations at the National Defence Headquarters in 1980 and Chief of Maritime Doctrine and Operations in 1983. His last appointment was as Commander Maritime Command in 1983, in which role he demanded at least six more frigates to meet Canada's NATO commitment, before he retired in 1987.

He died on 2 March 2020 in Halifax, Nova Scotia.

Awards and decorations
Wood's personal awards and decorations include the following:

110px

110px

He was a qualified Submariner and as such wore the Canadian Forces Submariner Dolphins

References

1934 births
Canadian admirals
Living people
Commanders of the Order of Military Merit (Canada)
People from Charlottetown
Canadian military personnel from Prince Edward Island
Commanders of the Royal Canadian Navy